Dragan Ivanović (born 2 December 1969) is a Serbian football manager.

Managerial career
Ivanović started his managerial career at ČSK Čelarevo, making himself a name for discovering and promoting new talents, such as Aleksa Vukanović, Milan Pavkov, and Srđan Plavšić, among others.

In June 2016, Ivanović was appointed as manager of Serbian SuperLiga club Napredak Kruševac, but left in December that year to take over at Vojvodina. He was sacked by the club's board in April 2017.

In March 2018, Ivanović became manager of Serbian League Vojvodina club Radnički Sremska Mitrovica.

Managerial statistics

References

External links
 
 

1969 births
Living people
Sportspeople from Novi Sad
Serbian football managers
FK Napredak Kruševac managers
FK Vojvodina managers
FK Rad managers
Serbian SuperLiga managers